Muhammad Shobran (born July 6, 1983 in Palembang, South Sumatra) is an Indonesian footballer that currently plays for Sriwijaya in the Indonesia Super League.

Honours

Club honors
Sriwijaya
Indonesia Super League (1): 2011–12

References

External links

1983 births
Association football defenders
Living people
Indonesian footballers
Liga 1 (Indonesia) players
Persib Bandung players
Persiba Balikpapan players
Sriwijaya F.C. players
Indonesian Premier Division players
Persikab Bandung players
People from Palembang